Pachyschesis is a genus of crustaceans belonging to the monotypic family Pachyschesidae.

Species:

Pachyschesis acanthogammarii 
Pachyschesis bazikalovae 
Pachyschesis bergi 
Pachyschesis branchialis 
Pachyschesis bumammus 
Pachyschesis crassus 
Pachyschesis cucuschonok 
Pachyschesis indiscretus 
Pachyschesis inquilinus 
Pachyschesis karabanowi 
Pachyschesis lamakini 
Pachyschesis pinguiculus 
Pachyschesis punctiommatus 
Pachyschesis rarus 
Pachyschesis sideljowae 
Pachyschesis vorax

References

Amphipoda